The , branded as  is a limited express train service in Japan operated by Central Japan Railway Company (JR Central), which runs between  and  via . Like all JR Central limited express trains, a limited express fee has to be paid, on top of the normal fare to ride this service.

Route

Trains start or terminate at Nagoya Station. There was a daily return service between Nagano and Ōsaka, which travelled a total distance of 274.1 miles (441.2 km), taking approximately 5 hours 30 minutes, once making the Shinano Japan's furthest travelling limited express service. The service was discontinued on 26 March 2016, due to declining passenger numbers. In the past, some trains also ran seasonally to  station but these ceased operations too.

Trains stop at the following stations:

 - -  -  - -  - - -  -  -  - - -  - 

Stations in brackets indicate the stations where not all Shinano services stop at.

Rolling stock
 383 series 6-, 8-, or 10-car EMUs (since 1 December 1996)

Past
 KiHa 181 series DMUs (1968–1972)
 381 series EMUs (1972–2008)

Accommodation
Green car (first class) and standard class accommodation is provided, with 2+2 abreast unidirectional seating in both classes. All trains are no smoking. Onboard catering services ceased on 16 March 2013.

History
The Shinano service was first introduced on 11 November 1953 as a "semi-express" operating between Nagoya and Nagano. This was upgraded to "express" status from 13 December 1959, and became a "limited express" from 1 October 1968.

References

External links

 JR Central Shinano information 

Named passenger trains of Japan
Central Japan Railway Company
Railway services introduced in 1953